The Great Divide is the 50th studio album released in 2002 by American country music singer Willie Nelson. It contains several duets and musical collaborations with artists such as Rob Thomas of Matchbox Twenty, Lee Ann Womack, Kid Rock, Sheryl Crow, Brian McKnight, and Bonnie Raitt. The album produced two chart singles in "Mendocino County Line" and "Maria (Shut Up and Kiss Me)", which respectively reached #22 and #41 on the Hot Country Songs charts. Also included is a cover of "Just Dropped In (To See What Condition My Condition Was In)", previously a hit for Kenny Rogers and the First Edition.  The songs "Mendocino County Line," "Last Stand in Open Country," and "This Face" were co-written by Bernie Taupin, the lyricist best known for his collaborations with Elton John.

Track listing

Reception

The album was panned for the excessively adult contemporary production. Pat Blashill of Rolling Stone said "Nelson is a performer who uses plain, powerful lyrics and a handsome but unvarnished voice to great effect. Much of that gets lost in the adult-contemporary production goop and heavenly choirs" of this release. Stephen Thomas Erlewine of Allmusic said it is "an accomplished, classy album, but it sure as hell isn't a Willie Nelson album." Both agreed "the best moments here are the ones in which Nelson just does his thing all by his bad self."

Personnel
Willie Nelson - acoustic guitar & vocals
Michael Black, Louis Dean Nunley, John Wesley Ryles, Lisa Silver, Harry Stinson, The Waters Sisters, Dennis Wilson, Curtis Young - backing vocals
Heitor Teixeira Peirera - electric & acoustic guitars, whistling, backing vocals
Reggie Young - guitars
Dan Dugmore - steel guitar
Greg Leisz - dobro
Alison Krauss, Gabe Witcher - fiddle
Mickey Raphael - harmonica
Christopher Wade Damerst, Danny Saber - programming
Matt Rollings - Fender Rhodes, wurlitzer, organ
Greg Phillinganes - keyboards
Matt Serletic - electronics, Backing vocals
Lee Sklar, Neil Stubenhaus - bass guitar
Kenny Aronoff, John Robinson - drums
Brad Dutz - percussion
Bruce Fowler, Dan Higgins - horns
Orchestra Conducted By Pete Anthony & Matt Serletic; concertmaster: Bruce Dukov

Production
Produced By Matt Serletic
Engineered By Mark Dobson, Steve Marcantonio, Dennis Sands & David Thoener, with assistance from David Bryant, Todd Johnson, Tosh Kasai, John Nelson, John Rodd & Sam Story
Mixed By Derek Carlson, Jay Goin & David Thoener
Mastered By Stephen Marcussen

Charts

Weekly charts

Year-end charts

References

2002 albums
Willie Nelson albums
Lost Highway Records albums
Albums produced by Matt Serletic